The Public Service Commission in Hong Kong is the principal statutory advisory body to the Hong Kong Chief Executive on civil service appointments, promotions and discipline. The Commission is tasked with ensuring fairness in hiring and disciplinary practices as outlined in the Public Service Commission Ordinance and Chapter 93 of the Laws of Hong Kong.

History and remit
The Commission was established in 1950, with the primary aim of increasing the proportion of local Hongkongers appointed.

The Commission chairman and (currently eight) members are appointed by the Chief Executive.

Over the years since it was set up, the scope of concern of the Commission has narrowed somewhat, as the number of civil servants, and hence cases has increased - from a permanent establishment of 18,500 posts at the outset to 160,000 posts today.

In 1971, disciplinary cases came under the Commission's remit.

The Secretariat of the Public Service Commission provides day-to-day operational support.

Chairmen

See also
 Hong Kong Civil Service

References

External links
Public Service Commission 
Cap. 93 Public Service Commission Ordinance

Hong Kong government departments and agencies
Government agencies established in 1950
1950 establishments in Hong Kong
National civil service commissions